The 2016 World TeamTennis season was the 41st season of the top professional team tennis league in the United States. Pursuant to a sponsorship agreement with Mylan N.V., the official name of the league was Mylan World TeamTennis in 2016.

The San Diego Aviators defeated the Orange County Breakers, 25–14 in extended play, in the WTT Finals to win the King Trophy as WTT champions.

Competition format
The 2016 World TeamTennis season included six teams. Unlike previous seasons, the teams were not split into two conferences. Each team played a 12-match regular-season schedule with six home and six away matches. The top two teams in the regular season qualified for the World TeamTennis Final at Forest Hills Stadium in New York City. The higher seed was treated as the "home" team in the WTT Final and had the right to determine order of play. The winner of the WTT Final was awarded the King Trophy.

Franchise movement, contraction and expansion
On December 14, 2015, the Austin Aces announced that the team would move back to Orange County, California for the 2016 season and be renamed the Orange County Breakers. On January 27, 2016, the Breakers announced that they would play their home matches at Breakers Stadium at the Newport Beach Tennis Club.

In December 2015, Randy Peters Catering of Citrus Heights, California sued the California Dream and its three owners in Sacramento County Superior Court demanding US$19,249 for its unpaid bills as the team's food concessionaire. Also in December 2015, one of the Dream's minority owners, Bob Kaliski, told The Sacramento Bee that he had personally lost US$175,000 investing in the team and that majority owner Jeff Launius had told him the Dream owed its vendors US$192,000 at the end of the season. Kaliski said, "I don't know if the team is going to be back or not. I know I'm not going to be back. I don't know about the rest of the team." WTT said that the Dream had until the end of December to meet its financial commitments to the league in order to secure its spot for 2016. On January 13, 2016, WTT announced that the Dream franchise had been terminated due to noncompliance with the team's obligations to the league.

On February 17, 2016, WTT announced that the Boston Lobsters had folded. The team had been owned and operated by the league during the 2015 season after the retirement of its former owner Bahar Uttam, who walked away from it. WTT had been unable to find a new owner for the franchise. In a press release, WTT commissioner Ilana Kloss said, "We spent more than a year seeking a local owner or ownership group, but unfortunately we were not able to find the right fit." She went on to say that WTT was leaving the door open for a return to Boston if the right ownership could be found. Keith Callahan, general manager of the Manchester Athletic Club said that the club had been approached by WTT to take over ownership of the team but had turned it down. "We just made a decision not to do that," he said. "It would have taken an enormous amount of resources to take on an operation like that, and we made a decision to commit those resources to improving the business and to making improvements for our members to make the operation better for them and for the community." WTT's asking price for the Lobsters was US$1 million.

Concurrent with the announcement of the folding of the Lobsters, WTT announced an expansion team for New York City named the New York Empire that began play in 2016. The team played its home matches at Forest Hills Stadium in Forest Hills, Queens, New York City, New York.

Draft
WTT conducted its 2016 draft on March 25, in Key Biscayne, Florida. The order in which teams selected was based on the results the teams achieved in 2015, with weaker teams selecting earlier and stronger teams selecting later. The draft order is ordinarily determined as follows:
 Nonplayoff teams ranked from worst regular-season record to best
 Conference championship loser with the worse record of the two
 Conference championship loser with the better record of the two
 WTT Final loser
 WTT champion
Expansion teams select in the middle of each round. If there is an even number of teams, an expansion team will select in the middle position that is closest to the first pick. There were three nonplayoff teams in 2015, and ranked from worst record to best record, they were
 Springfield Lasers
 San Diego Aviators
 Boston Lobsters
However, the Lobsters folded prior to the draft. Therefore, the Lasers and Aviators were the only two nonplayoff teams and assigned the preliminary first and second positions. The Philadelphia Freedoms lost the 2015 Eastern Conference Championship Match and had a worse record than the California Dream, which lost the Western Conference Championship Match. Therefore, the Freedoms were assigned the preliminary third position. Since the Dream franchise was terminated, it was not assigned a draft position. The Orange County Breakers, playing in 2015, as the Austin Aces, lost the WTT Final and were assigned the preliminary fourth draft position. The WTT Champion Washington Kastles were assigned the preliminary fifth draft position. The expansion New York Empire was assigned the third draft position by rule, since there was an even number of teams, and this is the middle position closest to the first position. This resulted in the Freedoms, Breakers and Kastles all moving down one position from their preliminary positions. Each team could protect certain players from its 2015 roster. Marquee players or doubles teams and wildcard players could be protected if they appeared in a match for the team in 2015. Exempt, roster and substitute players who appeared in at least three matches for the team in 2015, could also be protected. Teams could also protect players who qualified for protection based on match appearances in 2014, but were unable to play in 2015, due to injury. Teams holding the right to protect players could trade those rights before or during the draft. If a team chooses a roster-exempt player, one who is not required to be a full-time member of the team, it is possible for a team to make four selections in the roster player portion of the draft and not have two male and two female full-time players. In such cases, these teams are permitted to make selections in additional rounds of the roster player draft until they have a complete roster. Teams that have two male and two female full-time players may select roster-exempt players in rounds past the fourth round. The selections made are shown in the tables below.

Marquee draft – first round

Marquee draft – second round

Roster draft – first round

Roster draft – second round

Roster draft – third round

Roster draft – fourth round

Roster draft – fifth round

Notes:

Event chronology

Off-season
 December 14, 2015: The Austin Aces announced that the team would move back to Orange County, California for the 2016 season and be renamed the Orange County Breakers.
 January 13, 2016: WTT announced that the California Dream franchise had been terminated due to noncompliance with the team's obligations to the league.
 February 17, 2016: WTT announced that the Boston Lobsters had folded, because the league had been unable to find a new owner for the franchise.
 February 17, 2016: WTT announced an expansion team for New York City to be named the New York Empire that will begin play in 2016. The team announced it would play its home matches at Forest Hills Stadium in Forest Hills, Queens, New York City, New York.
 March 25, 2016: WTT conducted its 2016 player draft.

Regular season
 July 31, 2016: The New York Empire made its debut with a home loss to the Washington Kastles, 22–15.
 August 4, 2016: The New York Empire secured the first win in franchise history, when it defeated the Springfield Lasers, 19–15, at Forest Hills Stadium.
 August 10, 2016: With a record of 2 wins and 7 losses, the New York Empire was eliminated from postseason contention when it lost to the Philadelphia Freedoms, 17–16, in a super tiebreaker (7–3).
 August 10, 2016: With a record of 2 wins and 7 losses, the Springfield Lasers were eliminated from postseason contention when they lost to the Orange County Breakers, 22–19, in extended play. It is the second consecutive season the Lasers have missed the postseason.
 August 11, 2016: With a record of 8 wins and 2 losses, the Orange County Breakers clinched a berth in the WTT Finals for the second consecutive season when they defeated the New York Empire, 19–17.
 August 12, 2016: With a record of 5 wins and 5 losses, the five-time defending champion Washington Kastles were eliminated from postseason contention, when they won the third set of men's doubles in their match against the Springfield Lasers, 5–3. At the start of play, the Kastles could only qualify for the postseason in the case of a three-way tie with the Philadelphia Freedoms and the San Diego Aviators. In games won in matches against common opponents, the Aviators led with 149 with one common-opponent match to play, the Freedoms had 136 with one common-opponent match to play, and the Kastles had 118 with two common-opponent matches to play. Therefore, the maximum number of games the Kastles could win in matches against common opponents was 168 at the start of play. The Aviators won 19 games in the first four sets of their match against the New York Empire, which started one hour earlier than the Kastles' match in Springfield, to reach 168 games won against common opponents. The Kastles still could have won the next step of the three-way standings tiebreaker on fewest games lost in matches against common opponents. However, after dropping the first two sets of the match, the only way the Kastles could still reach 168 games won against common opponents was by losing the first four sets and winning the match, 25–24, in a super tiebreaker. Therefore, in an odd set of circumstances, when the Kastles won the third set of their match, moments after the fourth set of the Aviators-Empire match was completed, the maximum number of games the Kastles could win against common opponents was reduced to 166, resulting in mathematical elimination. It is the first time the Kastles have missed the postseason since 2010. The Kastles went on to win the match in which their run of championships came to an end, 21–20.
 August 12, 2016: With a record of 8 wins and 3 losses, the San Diego Aviators clinched a berth in the WTT Finals with a 24–16 victory over the New York Empire. It is the Aviators' first postseason appearance since 2014, and first appearance in the WTT Finals for the franchise, since they lost in the 2010 Finals playing as the New York Sportimes. The Aviators victory also eliminated the Philadelphia Freedoms, who had won earlier in the evening to improve their record to 6 wins and 5 losses, from postseason contention. It is the first time the Freedoms have missed the postseason since 2013.
 August 13, 2016: With a record of 8 wins and 3 losses, the San Diego Aviators clinched the best regular-season record in WTT, when the Washington Kastles defeated the Orange County Breakers, 25–19, in extended play. This made the Aviators the top seed in the WTT Finals and gave them the option to set the order of play.

WTT Finals
 August 26, 2016: The San Diego Aviators defeated the Orange County Breakers, 25–14 in extended play, at Forest Hills Stadium in New York City to win the King Trophy as 2016 WTT champions. The Aviators were led by WTT Finals Most Valuable Player Raven Klaasen who teamed with Darija Jurak to take the opening set of mixed doubles, 5–2, and later with 2016 WTT Male MVP Ryan Harrison for another 5–2 set win in the third set of men's doubles. Shelby Rogers took the second set of women's singles from 2016 WTT Female MVP Nicole Gibbs, 5–2, before teaming with Jurak for another 5–2 set win in the fourth set of women's doubles. After losing the fifth set in a tiebreaker, Harrison, who won a US Open qualifying match earlier in the day to secure a spot in the Grand Slam tournament, sealed the victory when he held serve in the second game of extended play. "It feels really nice to get the MVP award, but it feels a bit undeserving, because our whole team played very well," said Klaasen. "We were apart for four days, and when we saw each other again last night, it felt like we had been apart for a year. Our team chemistry has been great. We will be friends for the rest of our lives." Aviators coach John Lloyd, who was named 2016 WTT Coach of the Year a few days earlier, said, "It brings a lot of memories back; I played back in the US Open when it was on grass and clay. In fact, on this court I lost to the great Björn Borg. It was nice to play on this beautiful court. To come back and win this title was great." It was the third WTT title for the Aviators franchise, having won in 2005, playing as the New York Sportimes and in 2008, playing as the New York Buzz, and it was the team's first WTT championship since moving to San Diego in 2014.

Standings
Reference:

Results table
Reference:

WTT Finals match summary
August 26, 2016 at Forest Hills Stadium, New York City, New York:
#1 SAN DIEGO AVIATORS 25, #2 Orange County Breakers 14 (extended play)
 Mixed Doubles: Darija Jurak and Raven Klaasen (Aviators) def. Alla Kudryavtseva and Scott Lipsky (Breakers), 5–2
 Women's Singles: Shelby Rogers (Aviators) def. Nicole Gibbs (Breakers), 5–2
 Men's Doubles: Ryan Harrison and Raven Klaasen (Aviators) def. Scott Lipsky and Dennis Novikov (Breakers), 5–2
 Women's Doubles: Darija Jurak and Shelby Rogers (Aviators) def. Nicole Gibbs and Alla Kudryavtseva (Breakers), 5–2
 Men's Singles: Dennis Novikov (Breakers) def. Ryan Harrison (Aviators), 5–4
 Extended Play – Men's Singles: Ryan Harrison (Aviators) 1, Dennis Novikov (Breakers) 1

Note:

Individual statistical leaders
The tables below show the WTT players who had the highest regular-season winning percentages in each of the league's five events. Only players who played in at least 40% of the total number of games played by their team in a particular event are eligible to be listed among the official WTT league leaders for that event.

Men's singles

Women's singles

Men's doubles

Women's doubles

Mixed doubles

Individual honors
Reference:

Team statistics
The tables below show the regular-season winning percentages of each team in each of the league's five events.

Men's singles

Women's singles

Men's doubles

Women's doubles

Mixed doubles

Television
The 2016 season was the third year of a four-year television rights contract between WTT and ESPN, Inc. The WTT Final was streamed live on ESPN3, which also streamed one match each night during the regular season. ESPN2's live telecast of the WTT Final began at 5:00 pm EDT, one hour after the match's start time.

The following regular-season matches were streamed live on ESPN3 and rebroadcast the following day on the Tennis Channel:
 6:00 pm EDT, Sunday, July 31: Washington Kastles at New York Empire
 7:00 pm EDT, Monday, August 1: Springfield Lasers at Washington Kastles
 7:00 pm EDT, Tuesday, August 2: Springfield Lasers at Philadelphia Freedoms
 10:00 pm EDT, Wednesday, August 3: San Diego Aviators at Orange County Breakers
 7:00 pm EDT, Thursday, August 4: Springfield Lasers at Philadelphia Freedoms
 10:00 pm EDT, Friday, August 5: New York Empire at San Diego Aviators
 10:00 pm EDT, Saturday, August 6: Washington Kastles at San Diego Aviators
 10:00 pm EDT, Sunday, August 7: Philadelphia Freedoms at Orange County Breakers
 7:00 pm EDT, Monday, August 8: New York Empire at Washington Kastles
 7:00 pm EDT, Tuesday, August 9: Washington Kastles at New York Empire
 7:00 pm EDT, Wednesday, August 10: New York Empire at Philadelphia Freedoms
 8:00 pm EDT, Thursday, August 11: San Diego Aviators at Springfield Lasers
 7:00 pm EDT, Friday, August 12: San Diego Aviators at New York Empire
 5:00 pm EDT, Saturday, August 13: Orange County Breakers at Washington Kastles

Select matches streamed live by ESPN3 were rebroadcast by regional sports networks Altitude Sports and Entertainment, Comcast SportsNet affiliates, Mediacom Connections and MSG.

Sponsorship
On December 8, 2014, WTT announced that its title-sponsorship agreement with Mylan N.V. was extended for two more years through the 2017 season. As part of its partnership with WTT, Mylan will continue to sponsor events at which children meet with WTT players and are introduced to tennis, charitable events and the Mylan Aces program which allows each team to select a local charity for which it can earn money donated by Mylan by recording the most aces in the league on a given day during the regular season.

See also

 Team tennis

References

External links
 World TeamTennis official website

 
World TeamTennis season
World TeamTennis seasons